Judy Lake is a lake in Berrien County, in the U.S. state of Michigan.

The name "Judy Lake" is a corruption of "Juday", the last name of J. Juday, the original owner of the site.

References

Lakes of Berrien County, Michigan